The Texas–Arlington Mavericks volleyball team, historically one of the most nationally prominent teams on campus, is an NCAA Division I college volleyball team set to join the Western Athletic Conference in July 2022. Home games are played at College Park Center, located on University of Texas at Arlington's campus in Arlington. The team has appeared in eight AIAW National Tournaments, eight NCAA Tournaments and one National Invitational Volleyball Championship Tournament, collecting 12 regular seasons titles and ten conference tournament titles along the way.

Team history 

The Mavericks began competition in the Association for Intercollegiate Athletics for Women, as the NCAA didn't sponsor women's sports until the early 1980s. UTA's first coach was Jody Conradt who was also the head coach for the basketball and softball teams. Right away, the Mavericks were competitors, appearing in the AIAW National Tournament eight out of a possible nine times, finishing as high as sixth nationally in 1981. They placed in the national tournament every year but one.

When the NCAA began competition, the Mavericks moved over to the Southland Conference, where UTA was a founding member in 1963. The Mavericks immediately became the most dominant team in the conference winning the first nine regular season titles. UTA won the first conference tournament in 1982, but the NCAA structure didn't allow UTA to play in a postseason match. Second-seeded Lamar would win the conference tournament in 1983 and 1984 and again the Mavericks missed playing in the postseason. The Mavericks finally won the SLC tournament in 1985 under Head Coach Lisa Love and would also claim the next five after that. The Mavericks would establish themselves as national contenders as they made four Sweet Sixteen appearances, two Elite Eight's and a Final Four in 1989.

The Mavericks slipped in stature during the '90's after Coach Love took over the program at USC. They were no longer the perennial Southland Conference favorite, though they did win three regular season championships in the '90's and two tournament crowns.

Despite having long been removed from the Southland, the volleyball team still has four more regular season championships and three more tournament titles.

UT Arlington would move from the Southland to the Western Athletic Conference in 2012, but would spend only one season in the WAC, moving from there to the Sun Belt Conference. After a later round of conference realignment in the early 2020s led to a major expansion of the Sun Belt's football side, UTA announced in January 2022 that it would return to the WAC that July.

In October 2015 against in-state Sun Belt rival Texas State, UTA's volleyball home attendance record was broken with 2,018 fans attending the match.

Facilities 
Until 2012, the Mavericks played at Texas Hall, which is a 3,300-seat theater on the campus. The teams played on the stage, and fans could watch the game from either the theater seats or the bleacher section.

A new arena called the College Park Center with a seating capacity of 7,000 opened for the 2012 season.  The facility is located on the eastern side of the campus along with new housing, parking, and retail developments.

Coaches 
The Mavericks have had 7 coaches, listed below, in their 40+ year history. J.T. Wenger, a former volleyball player at UCLA and former assistant coach at UCLA, Michigan State, and Colorado, is the current head coach.  Wenger is also the first male coach in program history. 
 Jody Conradt – 1973–1975 (3 seasons)
 Mary Ridgway – 1976–1981 (6 seasons)
 Lisa Love – 1982–1988 (7 seasons)
 Cathy George – 1989–1993 (5 season)
 Janine Smith – 1994–2003 (10 seasons)
 Diane Seymour – 2004–2016 (13 seasons)
J.T. Wenger – 2017–present (entering first season)

Season-by-season results

See also
List of NCAA Division I women's volleyball programs

References

External links